Horseshoe Pond is a lake located by Gale, New York. The outlet creek flows north into Long Pond, then continues into Catamount Pond. Fish species present in the lake are white sucker, smallmouth bass, brook trout, rock bass, yellow perch, and black bullhead. Access on north and west shore off Massawepie Road. Permit is required from June to August from the Boy Scout camp.

References

Lakes of New York (state)
Lakes of St. Lawrence County, New York